Taboga may refer to:

 Taboga District, Panama
 Taboga Island, Gulf of Panama
 Taboga, Panama 
 Taboga (moth), a snout moth genus in subfamily Pyralinae
 Taboga (sponge), a synonym for Tethya, a genus of sea sponges